Samuel Turner VC (February 1826 – 13 June 1868) was an English recipient of the Victoria Cross, the highest and most prestigious award for gallantry in the face of the enemy that can be awarded to British and Commonwealth forces.

Details
Turner was 31 years old, and a private in the 1st Battalion, 60th Rifles (later the King's Royal Rifle Corps) of the British Army during the Indian Mutiny, when the following deed on 19 June 1857 at Delhi, India took place for which he was awarded the VC:

References

Monuments to Courage (David Harvey, 1999)
The Register of the Victoria Cross (This England, 1997)

1826 births
1868 deaths
King's Royal Rifle Corps soldiers
British recipients of the Victoria Cross
Indian Rebellion of 1857 recipients of the Victoria Cross
People from Suffolk Coastal (district)
British Army recipients of the Victoria Cross
Military personnel from Suffolk